Maelimarchair (died 746) was Bishop of Aughrim, County Galway. 

Maelimarchair is one of the few recorded Bishops of Aughrim, which was situated in western Uí Maine. Nothing appears to be known of his origins or life. His term seems to have coincided with that of king Cathal Maenmaighe, who died in 745.

References 

 Annals of Ulster at CELT: Corpus of Electronic Texts at University College Cork
 Annals of Tigernach at CELT: Corpus of Electronic Texts at University College Cork
Revised edition of McCarthy's synchronisms at Trinity College Dublin.
 Byrne, Francis John (2001), Irish Kings and High-Kings, Dublin: Four Courts Press, 
 Lysaght, Eamonn (1978), The Surnames of Ireland. , pp.233-34.

People from County Galway
8th-century Irish bishops
746 deaths
Year of birth unknown